Rodrigo Salinas Dorantes (born 9 May 1988) is a Mexican professional footballer who plays as a right-back.

Professional career
Rodrigo Salinas was born in Puebla on 9 May 1988. He spent most of his teen years in the Puebla youth system. He made his first division debut with Puebla on 17 August 2008 in a match again Toluca which the club lost 3–1. He managed to score his first goal on 20 October 2010 in the Apertura 2010 against Querétaro F.C. in the 70-minute. He has Played with Puebla FC since the 2008 Apertura.

On 13 December 2017, Salinas signed a contract with Toluca, after being on loan for two tournament.

Style of play
He is described as a very quick player who plays with enthusiasm and has caught the attention of several top clubs in Mexico and was rumoured to sign with C.F. Pachuca in 2011 but the negotiation failed because Puebla would only send him out on loan.

References

External links
 

1988 births
Living people
Footballers from Tlaxcala
Mexican footballers
Club Puebla players
Atlético Morelia players
C.F. Pachuca players
Club Tijuana footballers
Atlas F.C. footballers
Deportivo Toluca F.C. players
Liga MX players
Association football defenders